This is a List of National Historic Landmarks in Pennsylvania.  There are 169 in the state.  Listed in the tables below are the 102 NHLs outside Philadelphia. For the 67 within Philadelphia, see List of National Historic Landmarks in Philadelphia.

Three of these sites are shared with other states and are credited by the National Park Service as being located in those other states: the Delaware and Hudson Canal (centered in New York but extending into Pennsylvania); the Beginning Point of the U.S. Public Land Survey (on the Ohio–Pennsylvania border); and the Minisink Archeological Site, on the New Jersey-Pennsylvania border.

National Historic Landmarks in Pennsylvania (excluding Philadelphia)

Following are National Historic Landmarks in Pennsylvania, but outside Philadelphia. For consistency, the National Historic Landmark name is used to label each one.

|}

See also

National Register of Historic Places listings in Pennsylvania
List of National Historic Landmarks by state
List of National Historic Sites in United States
List of Pennsylvania state historical markers

References

External links

Pennsylvania's Cultural Resources Geographic Information System
Listings at NationalRegisterofHistoricalPlaces.com

Pennsylvania
 
National Historic Landmarks